Pressentin Creek is a stream in the U.S. state of Washington.

Pressentin Creek was named after Charles von Presentin, an early settler.

See also
List of rivers of Washington

References

Rivers of Skagit County, Washington
Rivers of Washington (state)